The Lonesome Hunters is a 2022 comicbook series by cartoonist Tyler Crook, published by Dark Horse Comics. It is Crook's first major comics work he wrote himself.

Publication history
The concept for The Lonesome Hunters developed from an idea he had in 2012. The series is not his first time writing—he previously wrote Tales from Harrow County short stories and serialized The Void Without on Instagram—but it is his first time writing a project of this scale. In part, the story explores his own fascination with swords. It also explores his interest in coming-of-age stories and the effects of trauma. The title of the series is a reference to Crook's favorite book, Carson McCullers's The Heart Is a Lonely Hunter.

Crook first came up with the idea the series (then titled The Old Man and the Magpie) in 2012 and even began writing and drawing it. This version was ultimately abandoned, but he continued working on the project until 2019 when he locked down the story and pitched it to his editor, Daniel Chabon. The project was approved, but delayed until 2022 by the COVID-19 pandemic.

Though the initial announcement was only for a four-issue miniseries, Crook stated plans for a much longer story running twenty-four to thirty-two issues. The series was renewed for a second arc in August 2022, and formally announced as the four-issue miniseries The Wolf Child in February 2023.

Mecha-Sabre Gemini
This is a fictional 1980s anime in The Lonesome Hunters, which Lupe used to watch with her mother. Mecha-Sabre Gemini is an amalgam of Neon Genesis Evangelion, Robotech, and Guillermo del Toro's Pacific Rim. The main character's name, Katsuhiro, is a reference to Katsuhiro Otomo. Thematically, the anime reflects elements of Howard's and Lupe's personal issues.

Characters
Howard Howard is a man living a lonely life in hiding. Despite being very old, there's the sense that he hasn't truly lived yet. Crook has said the initial inspiration for Howard came from seeing an image of Patrick Stewart holding a sign protesting violence against women, and wondering why Stewart was also carrying a bag of groceries for the photograph. Howard and his giant sword was in part inspired by Guts in Kentaro Miura's Berserk.
Guadalupe ("Lupe") Lupe is not just one of the lead characters; she's also the narrator looking back at this period of her life. As an orphan, she's already experienced a lot of trauma in her life, but the worst is still yet to come. Crook said that while Howard arrived almost fully formed, Lupe was a character that came to him more gradually. He wanted her appearance to reflect that her guard is up, which he felt was true of women he has known at Lupe's age.

Reception
The Lonesome Hunters currently holds a 9.4 out of 10 on the review aggregation site Comicbook Round Up. ComicBook's Christian Hoffer gave 5/5 to all four issues of the first miniseries, calling it one of the sleeper hits of the summer. The intergenerational friendship between Howard and Lupe was a consistently praised point from reviewers, as was the way Crook portrayed the characters' emotions and different aspects of loneliness. The initial reaction to the story's pacing was mixed with Comicon saying there wasn't enough in the first issue and Major Spoilers saying the first issue established itself well, but there wasn't enough of anything else. However, Multiversity Comics praised the first issue for slowing down and focusing on character beats and subtext rather than plot. Podcasters Brad and Lisa Gullickson praised the well-observed character beats that felt very true to life despite the story's more fantastical elements.

Collections

References

Dark Horse Comics titles
2022 comics debuts